Abul Lais Siddiqui (Urdu: ابو اللیث صدیقی) (15 June 1916 – 7 September 1994) was a Pakistani author, researcher, critic, linguist and scholar of Urdu literature and linguistics.

Career
He remained associated with the University of Karachi as professor and chairman, Department of Urdu. After retirement, he devoted his time to writing, guiding research, public speaking and media appearances. Siddiqui headed as Chief Editor the Urdu Lughat Board (The Board for Urdu Dictionary) from 1962 to 1984. During his period, Urdu Dictionary Board published its first six of 22 volumes.

Education
He earned his M.A. and Ph.D degrees in Urdu from the Aligarh Muslim University. After migrating to Pakistan from India, he later went to London School of Oriental Studies and Columbia University for higher education in linguistics. Siddiqui returned to Pakistan and first taught at University of the Punjab, Lahore and later at University of Karachi where he served as chairman of Urdu department for nearly 20 years and was promoted to the status of professor emeritus. He also supervised over 50 PhD dissertations at University of Karachi.

Books
He had a vast collection of critical and literary writing to his credit, including over 20 books:
 Raft-O-Bood (Future and Present) - an autobiography of Abul Lais Siddiqui with introduction by Moinuddin Aqeel, published by Idara-i-yadgar-i-Ghalib, Karachi
 Aaj Ka Urdu Adab
 Iqbal Aur Maslak-e-Tasawwuf
 Urdu Ki Adabi Tareekh Ka Khaka

References

External links

1916 births
1994 deaths
Muhajir people
Pakistani literary critics
Linguists from Pakistan
Urdu-language non-fiction writers
Linguists of Urdu
Urdu critics
Aligarh Muslim University alumni
Academic staff of Aligarh Muslim University
Academic staff of the University of the Punjab
Academic staff of the University of Karachi
Columbia University alumni
Writers from Karachi
20th-century linguists